Muhamad Nor Haziq bin Mohd Aris (born 30 March 1990) is a Malaysian footballer who plays for Sarawak United as a goalkeeper.

References

External links
 

Malaysian footballers
Malaysia international footballers
Malaysia Super League players
PKNS F.C. players
Living people
1990 births
Association football goalkeepers